"Mysterious Girl" is the second overall single and third British single from singer-songwriter Peter Andre's second studio album, Natural (1996). It was written by Glen Goldsmith, Philip Jackson, Ollie Jacobs and Andre, and produced by Jacobs. The song features guest vocals from Caribbean rapper Bubbler Ranx. It was first released as a single by Melodian Records in Australia on 14 August 1995  and was issued in the United Kingdom the same year, but it was not until a re-release in 1996 that the song became a commercial success there.

During its original 1995–1996 release, "Mysterious Girl" peaked at number one in New Zealand and number two in the Netherlands and the United Kingdom. It was also a top-10 hit in Australia, Austria, Belgium, Denmark, Germany, Hungary, Ireland, Sweden, and Switzerland. On the Eurochart Hot 100, the single reached number 11 in September 1996. In 2004, the song was once again re-released in Ireland and the UK, where it topped the UK Singles Chart following extensive promotion.

Critical reception
Clem Bastow from The Guardian described "Mysterious Girl" as "a perennial classic from that peculiarly mid-90s period where reggae and dancehall had invaded the pop charts. It holds its own (perhaps due to the guest spot from Caribbean rapper Bubbler Ranx) alongside Maxi Priest's That Girl, Shaggy's Oh Carolina and Chaka Demus & Pliers' ebullient cover of Twist And Shout." Pan-European magazine Music & Media wrote that "Andre's sunshine reggae single automatically conjures up tropical beaches, palm and coconut trees. As this summer seems to be without end, the chances look good for the Australian." A reviewer from Music Week rated the song three out of five, adding, "After patiently building a UK fanbase, Australian Andre could make the Top 10 with this pleasant reggae track." James Hamilton from the magazine's RM Dance Update described it as a "accomplished but derivative Chaka Demus & Pliers/UB40/Bitty McLean-ish catchy 85.9bpm pop-reggae roller".

Chart performances
The song reached the top of the charts in New Zealand and number eight in Australia, and it peaked at number two on the UK Singles Chart. Following a lengthy campaign on The Chris Moyles Show in 2004, and Andre's appearance on the British reality show I'm a Celebrity, Get Me Out of Here!, the song was re-released as the first single from Andre's fourth studio album The Long Road Back, peaking at number one in February 2004. In Ireland, "Mysterious Girl" reached number three upon its initial release in 1996, but the 2004 reissue saw the song reach a new peak of number two.

Music video
Filmed in Thailand, the music video for "Mysterious Girl" depicts Ranx and Andre on a beach. There are montages of several women, Andre, and Ranx dancing in a lagoon shirtless and in their jeans. Andre is later seen dancing underneath a waterfall, a more iconic part of the video. Andre is last seen walking along the beach shirtless and later rolls in the sand as the sun sets. Clem Bastow from The Guardian wrote, "The video for the single was as much an advertisement for Andre’s personal trainer and spray-tan artist as it was a music video; the sight of him grooving in searingly blue tropical waters, proudly displaying his new look, was eye-popping (though not necessarily for the reasons he might have hoped)."

Track listings

 Australian CD and cassette single; UK CD single (1995)
 "Mysterious Girl" (radio edit)
 "Mysterious Girl" (Malibu edit)
 "Mysterious Girl" (extended mix)
 "Mysterious Girl" (instrumental)

 UK 7-inch single (1995)
A. "Mysterious Girl" (radio edit)
B. "Take Me Back"

 UK CD1 (1996)
 "Mysterious Girl" (radio edit)
 "Mysterious Girl" (R&B Shankmaster mix)
 "Mysterious Girl" (Malibu edit)
 "Turn It Up" (extended mix)

 UK CD2 (1996)
 "Mysterious Girl" (radio edit)
 "Mysterious Girl" (Jupiter's Swing mix)
 "Mysterious Girl" (Dissent & Submerged remix)
 "Mysterious Girl" (Bag o' Tricks mix)

 UK cassette single (1996)
 "Mysterious Girl" (radio edit)
 "Turn It Up" (extended mix)

 Dutch CD single (1996)
 "Mysterious Girl" (radio edit) – 3:36
 "Mysterious Girl" (R&B Shankmaster remix) – 5:13

 French CD single (1996)
 "Mysterious Girl" (radio edit)
 "Mysterious Girl" (Malibu edit)
 "Let's Get It On"

 European maxi-CD single (1996)
 "Mysterious Girl" (radio edit)
 "Mysterious Girl" (R&B Shankmaster mix)
 "Mysterious Girl" (Jupiter's Swing mix)
 "Mysterious Girl" (Bag o' Tricks mix)

 UK CD single (2004)
 "Mysterious Girl" (radio edit)
 "Mysterious Girl" (Jupiter soul mix)

Charts

Weekly charts

Year-end charts

Certifications

References

External links
 Official video

1995 songs
1995 singles
1996 singles
2004 singles
Mushroom Records singles
Number-one singles in New Zealand
Number-one singles in Scotland
Peter Andre songs
Songs written by Glen Goldsmith
Songs written by Peter Andre
UK Singles Chart number-one singles
British reggae songs